Homec is a small settlement in the Municipality of Kobarid in the Littoral region of Slovenia. It is located in the Breginj Combe.

References

External links 
Homec on Geopedia

Populated places in the Municipality of Kobarid